WebCT Vista is a teaching and learning enterprise software run and developed by Blackboard Inc.  It is principally used by universities and other education institutions as classroom management software, and as a distance education service.   

Depending on the use of it by the lecturer, WebCT Vista can include class notes, audio streaming of the classes, quizzes and forums.

See also
WebCT
Learning management system
Virtual learning environment

External links
BlackBoard's Vista website

Virtual learning environments